Conestee Nature Preserve, formerly Lake Conestee Nature Preserve/Park, opened in 2006, is a  preserve along three miles of the Reedy River in Conestee, South Carolina, with  of trails, more than  of them paved and  of boardwalk. The Preserve contains both hardwood and evergreen forest, extensive wetlands, and a rich diversity of reptiles, mammals, and birds.  At least 223 bird species have been reported, and the National Audubon Society has designated the park as an Important Bird Area of Global Significance. In 2016 the state of South Carolina made the privately owned facility a wildlife sanctuary.

Lake Conestee was created when the Reedy River was dammed at the Conestee Mill in about 1892. In 2000 the Conestee Foundation, a 501(c)(3) conservation organization, was formed to lead the revitalization of the lake as a wetlands through the development of the nature preserve, and the foundation used settlement funds from a June 1996 Colonial Pipeline spill to purchase the lake and the dam. Once safety studies of the brownfield were complete, it was determined that no harm would result if the toxic sediment were left in place. 

In December 2016, inspectors from the state Department of Health and Environmental Control rated Conestee Dam, which is not keyed into the bedrock, in poor condition due to deterioration of mortar and water seepage.

References

External links

 Conestee Nature Preserve Official Site

Protected areas of Greenville County, South Carolina
Upstate South Carolina
Nature centers in South Carolina
Parks in South Carolina
Tourist attractions in Greenville, South_Carolina